Ostprignitz-Ruppin is a Kreis (district) in the northwestern part of Brandenburg, Germany. Neighboring are (from north clockwise) the districts Müritz and Mecklenburg-Strelitz in Mecklenburg-Western Pomerania, the districts
Oberhavel and Havelland, the district Stendal in Saxony-Anhalt, and the district Prignitz.

Geography
The district consists of plain countryside northwest of Berlin. It is densely forested. Many rivers and lakes can be found in its western, its central and its northeastern part. The main river in the district is the Dosse.

History
The district has always been distinguishable from the West Prignitz, having been settled originally by Slavs from a different part of Mecklenburg. It was officially created in 1993 by merging the districts Kyritz, Neuruppin and Wittstock. The district roughly covers the same territory as the two historic districts Ostprignitz and Ruppin. Osprignitz was created in 1815 as one of two districts covering the former county Prignitz, and was split into the districts Kyritz, Pritzwalk and Wittstock in 1952. Also in 1952 the district Ruppin was renamed to Neuruppin and had to give part of its territory to the districts Kyritz and Gransee.

Demography

Coat of arms
The eagle in the top of the coat of arms derives from the Counts of Arnstein, who ruled Ruppin in the 13th century. To the left is a fleur-de-lis representing the Counts von Plotho, a Wendish family who ruled Kyritz, where they had migrated from the Magdeburg area bringing German families such as the von Blumenthals with them. The mitre to the right symbolizes Wittstock, as Bishop Heinrich I made Wittstock the capital of the Prince-Bishopric of Havelberg.

Towns and municipalities

References

External links

 Official website (German)